Jaideep Bhambhu (born 19 March 1999) is an Indian cricketer. He made his List A debut on 21 February 2021, for Haryana in the 2020–21 Vijay Hazare Trophy. He made his Twenty20 debut on 4 November 2021, for Haryana in the 2021–22 Syed Mushtaq Ali Trophy.

References

External links
 

1999 births
Living people
Indian cricketers
Haryana cricketers
Place of birth missing (living people)